Jezernice may refer to:

Jezernice, Czech Republic, a municipality and village in the Olomouc Region
Jezernice, Croatia, an uninhabited village in Zagreb County
Jezernice (Višegrad), a village in Bosnia and Herzegovina